Amulree (Scottish Gaelic: Àth Maol Ruibhe, 'Ford of [St.] Maelrubha') is a small hamlet in Perth and Kinross, Scotland. It lies close to the geographical centre of Scotland.

Its parish church contains copies of records of the large number of people who stayed there prior to mass emigration – mostly to North Easthope, Canada – in the early 19th century, where a settlement (Amulree, Ontario) was named after it. The church is linked with Aberfeldy Parish Church. A history "Amulree and its Church" was written by a resident, Nancy Countess of Enniskillen - the American-born second wife of the 6th Earl of Enniskillen - in 1990. A notable minister was James McLagan. The River Braan flows past Amulree from Loch Freuchie.
 .

References

Villages in Perth and Kinross